The 1967 Scotch Cup was the eighth edition of the Scotch Cup. It was held in Perth, Scotland at the Perth Ice Rink from March 20–23, 1967. Eight teams competed at the tournament with Germany competing in the Scotch Cup for the first time. In the final, Scotland took home their first Scotch Cup defeating Sweden 8-5 in the final with Canada not getting a medal for the first time as the United States finished third.

Teams

Standings

Results

Draw 1

Draw 2

Draw 3

Draw 4

Draw 5

Draw 6

Draw 7

Playoffs

Semifinals

Final

References

External links

World Men's Curling Championship
Scotch Cup 
Scotch Cup, 1967
Scotch Cup, 1967 
Scotch Cup
Scotch Cup, 1967